Estadio Miguel Campomar is a multi-use stadium in Juan Lacaze, Uruguay.  It is currently used mostly for football matches and hosts the home matches of Deportivo Colonia.  The stadium holds 8,000 people.

References

Multi-purpose stadiums in Uruguay
Football venues in Uruguay
Sport in Colonia Department